Sammy Brooks (July 10, 1891 – May 16, 1951) was an American film actor. He appeared in 218 films between 1916 and 1938. He was born in New York City and died in Los Angeles, California.

Selected filmography

 Luke, the Candy Cut-Up (1916)
 Luke Pipes the Pippins (1916)
 Luke's Double (1916)
 Luke's Late Lunchers (1916)
 Luke Laughs Last (1916)
 Luke's Society Mixup (1916)
 Luke Rides Roughshod (1916)
 Luke, Crystal Gazer (1916)
 Luke's Lost Lamb (1916)
 Luke Does the Midway (1916)
 Luke Joins the Navy (1916)
 Luke and the Mermaids (1916)
 Luke's Speedy Club Life (1916)
 Luke and the Bang-Tails (1916)
 Luke, the Chauffeur (1916)
 Luke's Preparedness Preparations (1916)
 Luke, the Gladiator (1916)
 Luke, Patient Provider (1916)
 Luke's Newsie Knockout (1916)
 Luke's Movie Muddle (1916)
 Luke, Rank Impersonator (1916)
 Luke's Fireworks Fizzle (1916)
 Luke Locates the Loot (1916)
 Luke's Shattered Sleep (1916)
 Luke's Lost Liberty (1917)
 Luke's Trolley Troubles (1917)
 Lonesome Luke, Lawyer (1917)
 Lonesome Luke's Lively Life (1917)
 Lonesome Luke on Tin Can Alley (1917)
 Lonesome Luke's Honeymoon (1917)
 Lonesome Luke, Plumber (1917)
 Stop! Luke! Listen! (1917)
 Lonesome Luke, Messenger (1917)
 Lonesome Luke, Mechanic (1917)
 Lonesome Luke's Wild Women (1917)
 Over the Fence (1917)
 Lonesome Luke Loses Patients (1917)
 Pinched (1917)
 By the Sad Sea Waves (1917)
 Birds of a Feather (1917)
 Bliss (1917)
 Rainbow Island (1917)
 Love, Laughs and Lather (1917)
 The Flirt (1917)
 Clubs Are Trump (1917)
 All Aboard (1917)
 We Never Sleep (1917)
 Move On (1917)
 Bashful (1917)
 Step Lively (1917)
 The Big Idea (1917)
 The Tip (1918)
 The Lamb (1918)
 Hit Him Again (1918)
 Beat It (1918)
 A Gasoline Wedding (1918)
 Look Pleasant, Please (1918)
 Here Come the Girls (1918)
 Let's Go (1918)
 On the Jump (1918)
 Pipe the Whiskers (1918)
 It's a Wild Life (1918)
 Hey There! (1918)
 Kicked Out (1918)
 The Non-Stop Kid (1918)
 Two-Gun Gussie (1918)
 Fireman Save My Child (1918)
 The City Slicker (1918)
 Sic 'Em, Towser (1918)
 Somewhere in Turkey (1918)
 Are Crooks Dishonest? (1918)
 An Ozark Romance (1918)
 Bees in His Bonnet (1918)
 Swing Your Partners (1918)
 Why Pick on Me? (1918)
 Take a Chance (1918)
 She Loves Me Not (1918)
 Wanted - $5,000 (1919)
 Going! Going! Gone! (1919)
 Ask Father (1919)
 On the Fire (1919)
 I'm on My Way (1919)
 Look Out Below (1919)
 The Dutiful Dub (1919)
 Next Aisle Over (1919)
 A Sammy In Siberia (1919)
 Just Dropped In (1919)
 Young Mr. Jazz (1919)
 Crack Your Heels (1919)
 Ring Up the Curtain (1919)
 Si, Senor (1919)
 Before Breakfast (1919)
 The Marathon (1919)
 Pistols for Breakfast (1919)
 Swat the Crook (1919)
 Off the Trolley (1919)
 Spring Fever (1919)
 Billy Blazes, Esq. (1919)
 Just Neighbors (1919) 
 At the Old Stage Door (1919)
 Never Touched Me (1919)
 A Jazzed Honeymoon (1919)
 Count Your Change (1919)
 Chop Suey & Co. (1919)
 Heap Big Chief (1919)
 Don't Shove (1919)
 Be My Wife (1919)
 The Rajah (1919)
 He Leads, Others Follow (1919)
 Soft Money (1919)
 Count the Votes (1919)
 Pay Your Dues (1919)
 His Only Father (1919)
 Bumping Into Broadway (1919)
 Captain Kidd's Kids (1919)
 From Hand to Mouth (1919)
 His Royal Slyness (1920)
 Haunted Spooks (1920)
 An Eastern Westerner (1920)
 Number, Please? (1920)
 Now or Never (1921)
 Among Those Present (1921)
 The Noon Whistle (1923)
 Under Two Jags (1923)
 Pick and Shovel (1923)
 Collars and Cuffs (1923)
 Kill or Cure (1923)
 Oranges and Lemons (1923)
 A Man About Town (1923)
 Frozen Hearts (1923)
 The Soilers (1923)
 Scorching Sands (1923)
 Smithy (1924)
 Postage Due (1924)
 Zeb vs. Paprika (1924)
 Brothers Under the Chin (1924)
 Near Dublin (1924)
 Rupert of Hee Haw (1924)
 Wide Open Spaces (1924)
 Short Kilts (1924)
 Wild Papa (1925)
 Isn't Life Terrible? (1925)
 Should Sailors Marry? (1925)
 Wandering Papas (1926)
 Madame Mystery (1926)
 Say It with Babies (1926)
 Long Fliv the King (1926)
 Bromo and Juliet (1926)
 Berth Marks (1929)

References

External links

1891 births
1951 deaths
American male silent film actors
Male actors from New York (state)
20th-century American male actors